Cyberia may refer to:

Technology
 Cyberia (book), a 1994 non-fiction book by Douglas Rushkoff
 Cyberia (fest in SJCE), an annual technical fest conducted by IEEE-SJCE 
 Cyberia (ISP), a West Asian ISP serving Lebanon, Jordan and Saudi Arabia
 Cyberia, London, one of the first Internet cafés, and the first in the UK

Entertainment
 Cyberia (album), a 1995 album by Cubanate
 "Cyberia", a song by the Afro Celt Sound System from the album Seed
 Cyberia (video game), a 1994 video game
 The penal colony to which Dave Lister was sentenced in the Red Dwarf book Last Human
 The techno-rave night club featured in Serial Experiments Lain
 Cyberia, a 2008 book by Chris Lynch